John J. Hickey (born February 23, 1965 in St. Louis) is an American politician who served as a Missouri state representative, being first elected in 1992.  He was elected as a Democrat.  O'Connor attended St. Thomas Aquinas High School and University of Missouri–St. Louis.

References

1965 births
Democratic Party members of the Missouri House of Representatives
Living people
University of Missouri alumni